The Keystone School, on 3rd St. in Keystone, South Dakota, was listed on the National Register of Historic Places in 1981.

It is a large rural school built 1897-1900 by Eli Shomaker, with roof of wood shingles.

In 2018, it has been the Keystone Historical Museum for a number of years.

References

External links
Keystone Historical Museum, official site

		
National Register of Historic Places in South Dakota
School buildings completed in 1900
Pennington County, South Dakota
Schools in South Dakota
1900 establishments in South Dakota